Little Lambkins is a 1940 Color Classics cartoon.

Plot 
Mother puts her baby boy, Lambkins, in an outdoor playpen, but he is more mature than she realizes and quickly breaks out. With the help of a raccoon and a squirrel, they are soon raiding the watermelon patch. Mother returns. It turns out that it is moving day, and the family is moving to the city. Lambkins is not happy about leaving his animal friends. When they get to the new house, he sets about, sabotaging the kitchen and turning the icebox into an oven, the hot water tap into an ice dispenser, and the stove and phone into water spouts. Father and Mother flee back to the country house, and Lambkins is reunited with his animal friends.

References

External links
 

1940 animated films
1940 films
Paramount Pictures short films
Fleischer Studios short films
Short films directed by Dave Fleischer
Color Classics cartoons
1940s English-language films
1940s American films